Robin Ficker (born April 5, 1943) is an American disbarred attorney, real estate broker, former state legislator, political activist, sports heckler, and perennial political candidate. Ficker ran unsuccessfully for Montgomery County Executive in 2018 and for Governor of Maryland in 2022.

Early life and education
Ficker was born in Takoma Park, Maryland, attended Takoma Park Elementary, and graduated from Montgomery Blair High School.

Ficker attended the United States Military Academy for five semesters. He received a B.S. in electrical and mechanical engineering from Case Western Reserve University. Ficker attended the University of Pennsylvania Law School, receiving his J.D. from the University of Baltimore School of Law. Ficker also received an M.A. in public administration from American University in 1969.

Career
Ficker was a member of the Maryland Bar from 1973 until his disbarment in 2022. His first case went to the Supreme Court of the United States seeking to end the National Football League's blackout of sold out home football games. In 1973 Ficker, representing Deborah Drudge, gained a consent judgment signed by Federal District Court Judge Roszel C. Thomsen, forbidding evaluations based on facial features and physique, for positions in the office of the Montgomery County Attorney. The judgment said no future applicant could be asked any questions regarding marital status or child care arrangements. On January 6, 1986, U. S. District Court Judge Norman Ramsey, ordered, in a suit brought by Robin Ficker against the Montgomery County Board of Elections, that Md. Election Code Art. 33, S 23-5(4) limiting the payment of money to petition circulators for initiative measures be declared null and void under the First and Fourteenth Amendments.

Ficker won two landmark injunctions preventing the state of Maryland from denying access to serious traffic and criminal court records. In 1992, U.S. District Court Judge Eugene Nickerson granted Ficker an injunction against provisions of the Maryland Public Information Act that denied access to police reports, criminal charging documents, and traffic citations in the Maryland Automated Traffic System. A 2003 Attorneys General opinion said the 1992 "Ficker order is still in effect and enforceable." In 1997, in the United States Court of Appeals for the Fourth Circuit, Ficker successfully challenged the constitutionality of a Maryland law forbidding lawyers from targeted direct-mail solicitation of criminal and traffic defendants within thirty days of arrest.

In October 2009, represented by the American Civil Liberties Union, Ficker convinced parks officials in Montgomery and Prince George's Counties to rescind enforcement of a rule requiring a permit before a person could carry signs or solicit signatures in county parks. In 2013, Ficker represented a Hyattsville, MD man who was found not guilty by a jury of all 23 counts in a case of attempted murder, armed robbery, carjacking, assault and eluding police among other charges.

2013 school discipline cases 
In 2013, Ficker received widespread attention for securing school suspension reversals and disciplinary record expungement for children, ages 5- to 7-years old. A 6-year-old in Maryland had been charged with threatening "to shoot a student" for pointing his finger and saying "pow". A Pennsylvania 5-year-old was said to be making a "terroristic threat" by talking about a Hello Kitty bubble-blowing gun. A Virginia 6-year-old had been suspended for pointing his finger at another student who pretended to shoot him with a bow and arrow after their class had studied Native American culture. A 5-year-old Southern Maryland child had been suspended for 10 days for bringing a cap gun on to a school bus to show a friend. Still pending in Maryland is the matter of a suspended seven-year-old who chewed a toaster pastry into the shape of a gun.

Representation of Daron Dylon Wint 

When ex-convict Daron Dylon Wint was arrested and charged in the deaths of three family members and their housekeeper, in which a ten-year-old child was tortured in order to extract money from the child's father, Ficker said Wint didn't seem violent when he defended him in earlier cases. "My impression of him — I remember him rather well — is that he wouldn't hurt a fly. He's a very nice person", Ficker said.

Ficker characterized Wint as "kind and gentle", and added that authorities have arrested "the wrong guy" in the murder case, claiming, "They've made a big mistake here."

Wint was found guilty in 2018 and sentenced in 2019 to four consecutive terms of life in prison without the possibility of parole.

Controversies and disciplinary issues
In 1990, Ficker was publicly reprimanded by the Maryland Court of Appeals upon a finding that he had violated ethical rules prohibiting neglect, engaged in conduct prejudicial to the administration of justice, and lack of diligence.

In March 1998, he was indefinitely suspended from the practice of law, with the right to reapply for admission after 120 days, arising from violations related to competence, diligence, fairness to opposing counsel and parties, supervising lawyers and conduct prejudicial to the administration of justice.

In August 1998, he was privately reprimanded by the Maryland Attorney Grievance Commission for a violation related to competence. In January 2002, he was privately reprimanded by the Maryland Attorney Grievance Commission for a violation related to client communications. Ficker was again indefinitely suspended from the practice of law in 2007. A dissenting judge in that suspension commented, "If disbarment is not warranted in this case for these types of issues, with a respondent with this history, it will never be warranted." Ficker's law license was reinstated on December 8, 2008.

In 2017 he was again reprimanded by the Maryland Court of Appeals for showing up late to Howard County District Court for a scheduled hearing in December 2015. The Court of Appeals order also stated he violated the Maryland Rules of Professional Conduct in 2013 by hiring a disbarred lawyer in a non-lawyer capacity without alerting bar counsel.

In 2022, Ficker was found to have intentionally lied to a judge in 2019 and disbarred by the Maryland Court of Appeals.

Politics
Ficker has run for various state and local offices since the 1970s. He lost the Democratic primary to Joseph G. Anastasi.

In 1978, Ficker was elected to the Maryland House of Delegates as a Republican, representing Montgomery County from 1979 to 1983. He lost a 1980 congressional primary to incumbent Republican Congressman Newton Steers. Ficker lost his bid for re-election in 1982.

He ran for United States Senate in 2000, claiming to have shaken hands with more than 560,000 people before officially announcing his candidacy. Ficker unsuccessfully ran for Montgomery County Executive in 2006 receiving just under 10% of the vote.

In 2009, Ficker moved from his primary residence in Boyds to his childhood home in Colesville to run for County Council in District 4 where he won a three-way Republican primary with 58% of the vote. He lost to Democrat Nancy Navarro 61% to 35%. Moving back to Boyds in 2010, Ficker ran as a Republican for Montgomery County Council District 2. Ficker lost to State Delegate Craig L. Rice (D-Dist. 15), of Germantown 59% to 40%.

Ficker was a candidate in the 2012 Republican primary for the newly redistricted  seat held by 10-term incumbent Roscoe Bartlett, finishing fifth in an eight-candidate field.

Ficker ran unopposed for the 2014 Republican nomination for the District 15 State Senate seat in western Montgomery County. Running with his son Flynn Ficker on a candidate slate for the Maryland Senate and House, the Fickers in May reported visiting 20,000 homes. Ficker lost the District 15 State Senate election to Democrat Brian J. Feldman, who won 60.4% of the vote to Ficker's 39.5%, while his son lost his contest for the House election.

He finished fourth in an eight-candidate field.

Ficker won the 2018 Republican nomination for Montgomery County Executive unopposed. He was initially turned down for public matching funds. His campaign filed a lawsuit and was later notified it qualified for the public funding shortly after the primary. Ficker faced Democrat Marc Elrich and Democrat-turned-Independent Nancy Floreen in the general election on November 6, 2018. Ficker finished third with 16.5% of the votes, behind Floreen with 19.2% and the winner, Elrich, with 64.3%.

In April 2020, Ficker was present at a rally in Annapolis which protested Governor Larry Hogan's stay-at-home orders. Ficker was photographed holding a sign reading "Robin for Governor", apparently confirming reports that he planned to run for governor in the 2022 Maryland gubernatorial election. In July 2022, he lost the Republican primary, placing third behind Kelly M. Schulz and Dan Cox. Ficker later endorsed Cox in the general election.

Ballot initiatives
Since 1974, Ficker has become known for promoting a series of ballot initiatives. The issues range from term limits, curbing tax increases, to limiting budget waste and duplication. He collected as many as 15,000 signatures for each of 20 initiatives, that together received 2 million votes.

A county initiative he proposed for the November 2008 ballot received 194,151 votes, prevailing by 5,060 votes. The measure requires the nine-member Montgomery County Council to vote unanimously to raise property tax revenue above the local limit. The victory earned him the Libertarian Party's Free Market Hero of the week award.

In the fall of 2015, Ficker began campaigning for a ballot measure in the 2016 general election to place term limits on the Montgomery County Executive and Montgomery County Council members. In 2016, Ficker's term limit initiative passed with 69% of the vote, limiting County Councilmembers to three consecutive terms in office.

Sports heckler
Ficker is known for his passionate support of the NBA's Washington Bullets (now the Washington Wizards). For many years, he heckled the opposing team at the games. Ficker had seats at USAir Arena, located in Landover, Maryland, immediately behind the visiting bench. When the team moved to downtown in Washington D.C. to the MCI Center in 1997, the Wizards took the opportunity to reseat Ficker well away from the opposing team’s bench. He gave up his seats in response. Not having been to a Wizards' game since in April 1998, Ficker attended Game 4 of the Wizards-Pacers Eastern Conference Semifinals on May 11, 2014.

Though many players from opposing teams were not fans of Ficker, Phoenix Suns star Charles Barkley in particular thought so much of him and his ability to get under player’s skin that he flew him out to Phoenix during the 1993 NBA Finals. Barkley bought Ficker a ticket directly behind the bench of the visiting Chicago Bulls with the intent that Ficker's taunts would distract the Bulls players. Ficker did not last the first quarter before being removed by America West Arena security.

In 2012 Ficker appeared on The Jeff Probst Show in which he was playfully surprised by special guest Isiah Thomas, former professional basketball player, and Basketball Hall of Fame athlete. Probst shares that Thomas, in agreeing to appear on the show said, "Ficker was one of the greats". In 2013 Ficker was featured on ESPN's Olbermann in which his heckling was discussed along with the often acrimonious fan vs. player interactions that would result.

The University of Maryland wrestling team won Ficker's support in 2010 with his letter to The Washington Post criticizing the lack of coverage for the Terrapin team and his attendance at the Atlantic Coast Conference Tournament in Raleigh, North Carolina as well as the NCAA Division I Wrestling Championship in Omaha, Nebraska. His vocal and visible support remains ongoing as of 2015.

Personal life

Family
Ficker has a daughter and two sons. Ficker's daughter, Desiree Ficker, is a top female professional triathlete, finishing second at the 2006 Ironman Triathlon World Championships in Kailua-Kona, Hawaii. Ficker's 20-year marriage to the late Dr. Frances Annette Ficker ended in divorce.

1995 traffic incident
In 1996, Ficker was acquitted of destruction of property in a 1995 traffic incident and saw battery charges dropped by the State's Attorney after a jury deadlocked 10-2 in favor of acquittal. Ficker had been convicted in a non-jury District Court trial but appealed for a Circuit Court jury trial. In the traffic incident the pregnant driver of the car Ficker allegedly hit reported that he struck her in the face, breaking her glasses.

See also
 Maryland County Executive Election, 2006 (Montgomery County)
 Maryland County Executive Election, 2018 (Montgomery County)

References

External links
Robin Ficker at Ballotpedia
Project Vote Smart – Delegate Robin Ficker (MD) profile
Our Campaigns – Delegate Robin Ficker (MD) profile

1943 births
American University alumni
Case Western Reserve University alumni
Living people
Maryland lawyers
Republican Party members of the Maryland House of Delegates
People from Montgomery County, Maryland
People from Colesville, Maryland
Sports spectators
University of Baltimore School of Law alumni
University of Pennsylvania Law School alumni
United States Military Academy alumni
Washington Wizards
People from Takoma Park, Maryland
Candidates in the 2022 United States elections